Ch'uyku (Quechua for a narrow and twisted opening, hispanicized spelling Chuigo) is a mountain in the Andes of Peru which reaches an altitude of approximately . It is located in the Junín Region, Yauli Province, Marcapomacocha District. It lies south of a lake named Markapumaqucha.

References

Mountains of Peru
Mountains of Junín Region